George Johnston may refer to:

George Johnston (burgess) (1720–1766), American lawyer and politician
George Johnston (British Marines officer) (1764–1823), Lieutenant-Governor of New South Wales
George Johnston (naturalist) (1797–1855), Scottish naturalist and physician
George Johnston (engineer) (1855–1945), Scottish engineer and motorcar designer
George Johnston (general) (1868–1949), Australian army general and politician
George Johnston (politician) (1884–1977), Canadian politician
George Johnston (novelist) (1912–1970), Australian journalist and novelist
George Johnston (ice hockey) (1920–2006), National Hockey League player
George Johnston (footballer, born 1947), Scottish footballer
George Johnston (footballer, born 1998), footballer for Bolton Wanderers
George Bain Johnston (1829–1882), pioneer of River Murray, South Australia
George Benson Johnston (1913–2004), Canadian poet
George Doherty Johnston (1832–1910), American General and politician
George "Blue" Johnston (1907–?), Australian rules footballer for Glenelg
George Johnston (Australian footballer) (1877–1945), Australian rules footballer for Carlton
George Graham Johnston (1882–1960), politician in Ontario, Canada
George Napier Johnston (1867–1947), British Army officer who served with the New Zealand Military Forces
George Robert Johnston (1954–2004), known as the Ballarat Bandit, burglar
George Lawson Johnston, 1st Baron Luke (1873–1943), British businessman

See also
George Johnstone (disambiguation)
George Johnson (disambiguation)